The 165th New York Infantry Regiment (aka, "2nd Battalion Duryée's Zouaves" and "Smith's Zouaves") was an infantry regiment in the Union Army during the American Civil War.

Service
The 165th New York Infantry was organized at New York City, New York beginning August 1862 and mustered in for three-years service from August through December 1862 under the command of Lieutenant Colonel Abel Smith Jr.. Ten companies were eventually recruited for the regiment, but the last four companies recruited were consolidated with the first six companies.

The 165th New York Infantry was regarded as a sister regiment to the 5th New York Volunteer Infantry. The regiment wore the same uniform as the 5th New York Infantry with the exception of the tassel of the fez, which was dark blue instead of yellow-gold. Photographic evidence suggests that later in the war the 165th New York Infantry was given replacement sashes that were a solid red color without the light blue trim.

The regiment was attached to Independent Command, Department of the Gulf, to January 1863. 3rd Brigade, 2nd Division, XIX Corps, Department of the Gulf, to July 1863. 1st Brigade, 3rd Division, XIX Corps, to February 1864. 3rd Brigade, 1st Division, XIX Corps, Department of the Gulf, to July 1864, and Army of the Shenandoah, Middle Military Division, to February 1865. 3rd Brigade, 1st Provisional Division, Army of the Shenandoah, to April 1865. 3rd Brigade, Dwight's Division, Department of Washington, to June 1865. Dwight's Division, Department of the South, to September 1865.

The 165th New York Infantry mustered out of service September 1, 1865.

Detailed service
Left New York for New Orleans, La., December 2, 1862. Expedition from New Orleans, La., to Ponchatoula March 21–30, 1863. Action at North Pass March 23. Capture of Ponchatoula March 24. Berwick Bay March 26. Expedition to Amite River May 7–19. Moved to Baton Rouge May 20–24. Siege of Port Hudson May 24-July 9. Assaults on Port Hudson May 27 and June 14. Surrender of Port Hudson July 9. Moved to Baton Rouge July 22 and duty there until September. Sabine Pass Expedition September 4–11. Sabine Pass September 8. Moved from Algiers to Brashear City, then to Berwick. Western Louisiana Campaign October 3-November 30. Bayou Vermillion October 9–10. Carrion Crow Bayou October 11. Bayou Vermillion November 11. At New Iberia until January 7, 1864. Moved to Franklin January 7, and duty there until March. Red River Campaign March 10-May 22. Advance from Franklin to Alexandria March 14–26. Battle of Sabine Cross Roads April 8. Pleasant Hill April 9. Monett's Ferry, Cane River Crossing, April 23. At Alexandria April 26-May 13. Construction of dam at Alexandria April 30-May 10. Retreat to Morganza May 13–20. Mansura May 16. Duty at Morganza until July. Movement to New Orleans, then to Fort Monroe, Va., and Washington, D.C., July. Sheridan's Shenandoah Valley Campaign August 7-November 28. Detached with the brigade as supply train guard for the army August 14 to October 27. Duty near Middletown and Newtown until December 1864, and at Stevenson's Depot and Winchester until April 1865. Moved to Washington, D.C., and duty there until June. Grand Review of the Armies May 23–24. Moved to Savannah, Ga., June 30-July 7. Duty Savannah, Ga., and at Charleston, S.C., until September.

Casualties
The regiment lost a total of 124 men during service; 2 officers and 41 enlisted men killed or mortally wounded, 2 officers and 79 enlisted men died of disease.

Commanders
 Lieutenant Colonel Abel Smith Jr. - mortally wounded in action May 27, 1863 during the Siege of Port Hudson
 Lieutenant Colonel Gouverneur Carr
 Lieutenant Colonel William R. French

Notable members
 First Sergeant John Fleming, Company A - Queens County District Attorney and New York judge
2nd Lieutenant Abraham G. Mills, Company E - fourth president of the National League of Professional Base Ball Clubs (1883-1884), and is best known for heading the "Mills Commission" which controversially credited Major General Abner Doubleday with the invention of baseball

See also

 List of New York Civil War regiments
 New York in the Civil War

References

Further reading
 Album of the Second Battalion Duryee Zouaves, One Hundred and Sixty-fifth Regt. New York Volunteer Infantry (New York: s.n.), 1906.
 Dyer, Frederick H. A Compendium of the War of the Rebellion (Des Moines, IA: Dyer Pub. Co.), 1908.
 History of the Second Battalion Duryee: Zouaves (New York: s.n.), 1905.
 Hoey, George. The 165th New York Volunteers (S.l.: s.n.), 1890. [The text is written in poetry.]

External links
 National flag of the 165th New York Volunteer Infantry

Military units and formations established in 1862
Military units and formations disestablished in 1865
Infantry 165